Packet Clearing House (PCH) is the international nonprofit organization responsible for providing operational support and security to critical internet infrastructure, including Internet exchange points and the core of the domain name system. The organization also works in the areas of cybersecurity coordination, regulatory policy and Internet governance.

Overview
Packet Clearing House (PCH) was formed in 1994 by Chris Alan and Mark Kent to provide efficient regional and local network interconnection alternatives for the West Coast of the United States. It has grown to become a leading proponent of neutral independent network interconnection and provider of route-servers at major exchange points worldwide.  	  	

PCH provides equipment, training, data, and operational support to organizations and individual researchers seeking to improve the quality, robustness, and Internet accessibility. 	  	

, major PCH projects include 

 Building and supporting nearly half of the world's approximately 700 Internet exchange points (IXPs), and maintaining the canonical index of Internet exchange points, with data going back to 1994; 
 Operating the world's largest anycast Domain Name System (DNS) server platform, including two root nameservers, more than 400 top-level domains (TLDs) including the country-code domains of more than 130 countries, and the Quad9 recursive resolver; 
 Operating the only FIPS 140-2 Level 4 global TLD DNSSEC key management and signing infrastructure, with facilities in Singapore, Zurich, and San Jose;
 Implementing network research data collection initiatives in more than 100 countries; 
 Publishing original research and policy guidance in the areas of telecommunications regulation, including the 2011 and 2016 Interconnection Surveys, country reports such as those for Canada in 2012 and 2016 and Paraguay in 2012, and a survey of critical infrastructure experts for the GCSC; and 
 Developing and presenting educational materials to foster a better understanding of Internet architectural principles and their policy implications among policymakers, technologists, and the general public.

Notable past projects include the INOC-DBA critical infrastructure protection hotline communications system, now operated by the Brazilian CERT.

PCH has more than 500 institutional donors, including the Soros Open Society Institute, which funded PCH in developing open source tools which help Internet service providers (ISPs) optimize their traffic routing, reduce costs and increase performance of Internet service delivered to the public; the United Nations Development Programme, Cisco Systems, NTT/Verio, Level 3, Equinix, the governments of Sweden, Denmark, Canada, Mexico, France, Singapore, Chile, Switzerland, and the United States, and hundreds of Internet service providers and individuals.

PCH works closely with the United States Telecommunications Training Institute (USTTI) to offer courses on telecommunications regulation, Internet infrastructure construction and management, domain name system management, and Internet security coordination, three times a year in Washington, D.C. It also teaches in 80 to 100 on-location workshops a year throughout the world.

Locations
PCH maintains staffed offices in Paris, Berkeley, Dublin, Kathmandu, Johannesburg, Khartoum, Portland and Ottawa and operates critical network infrastructure within 236 Internet exchange points.

Board of directors

PCH's board of directors consists of Steve Feldman (chairman), Dorian Kim, and Bill Woodcock (executive director).

See also 
 Quad9

References

External links
 PCH.net - official website, including: Looking glass servers - White papers - Tutorials - Datasets
 Establishment of Nepal Internet Exchange: Interim Report
 Bill Woodcock: On an Internet Odyssey

Telecommunications economics
Organizations established in 1994
501(c)(3) organizations
Nonprofit institutes based in the United States
Non-profit organizations based in San Francisco
Non-profit organizations based in California
Internet governance organizations
Internet governance
Internet security
Internet-related organizations